Bashful Felix or Felix is Right on Target is a 1934 German comedy film directed by Carl Boese and starring Rudolf Platte, Ursula Grabley, and Jakob Tiedtke. It was made by Terra Film, with sets designed by art directors Robert A. Dietrich and Bruno Lutz.

Cast

References

Bibliography

External links 
 

1934 films
1934 comedy films
Films of Nazi Germany
German comedy films
1930s German-language films
Films directed by Carl Boese
German black-and-white films
1930s German films